Redwan Bourlès (born 2 January 2003) is a French professional footballer who plays as a forward for Ligue 1 club Lorient.

Early life 
Born in Lorient, Bourlès started playing football as early as 2009, with the Vigilante de , an amateur club from his hometown.

He moved to their neighbors of CEP Lorient in 2011, before entering the FC Lorient academy in 2014.

Career 
Bourlès made his professional debut for Lorient on 13 August 2021, coming on as a substitute during the 1–0 Ligue 1 home win against Monaco.

References

External links

2003 births
Living people
Sportspeople from Lorient
French footballers
Footballers from Brittany
Association football midfielders
Ligue 1 players
Championnat National 2 players
FC Lorient players